The Great Allentown Fair is an annual fair and agricultural show that is held at the Allentown Fairgrounds in Allentown, Pennsylvania. It is operated by the Lehigh County Agricultural Society.  It is one of the oldest fairs in the United States, and one of the largest in the state of Pennsylvania.

The fair was first held in 1852 to showcase agricultural advancements and to entertain patrons. It has since evolved to appeal to a broader audience, adding more entertainment and dining options.  Although it stays true to its agricultural roots by offering petting zoos, livestock judging contests, and a farmer's market, the modern-day fair focuses more on entertainment; it boasts a carnival, talent shows, and concerts.

History

Early history

The Lehigh County Agricultural Society held the first fair from October 6 to October 8, 1852, on Livingston's Lawn, a  plot located east of Fourth Street, between Walnut and Union Streets, in Allentown. The initial fair was so successful that in 1853 the Society undertook the purchase of a larger plot of land, north of Liberty Street and between Fifth and Sixth Streets, on which ticket offices and a two-story exhibition hall were built.  This location was the site of the second fair, held September 28, 29 and 30 of the same year. One of the most popular attractions of these early fairs was Stephen Lentz's Flying Coach, a brass band that performed atop a hay wagon.

In 1862, there was no fair due to the Civil War. During this time, the fairgrounds were used as a staging site for the 176th Regiment of Pennsylvania Volunteers.  The fair resumed in 1863. In 1876, in celebration of the 100th anniversary of the signing of the Declaration of Independence, a large reenactment of the Battle of Bunker Hill was held, which included many of Lehigh County's Civil War regiments and veterans as participants.  The "centennial" fair was a tremendous success.

New fairgrounds and name
Throughout the 1870s and 1880s, the popularity of the Allentown Fair continued to grow.  However, increased attendance led to dissatisfaction regarding the fairground's size, facilities, short race track and small grandstand.  In 1889, the Lehigh County Agricultural Society purchased a plot of land on Seventeenth Street, between Chew and Liberty Streets, to serve as the new fairgrounds.  One of the primary features of the new location was a new half-mile race track, with grandstands capable of seating 2,500. In celebration of the opening of the new fairgrounds, the fair was renamed the "Great Allentown Fair."

20th Century
From its earliest days, horse racing was a popular event at the Allentown Fair. In 1902, the fair's half-mile track was regarded as "one of the finest in the country."  In 1905, racehorse Dan Patch set a record of 2:01 on the half-mile track. In 1911, the present-day grandstand was built at the Allentown Fairgrounds, increasing the overall seating capacity from 2,500 to 10,000.

Between the years 1907 and 1914, airship races became a featured attraction at the fair.  In 1909, two airships - one bearing the American flag, the other that of Germany, took off from the fairgrounds, raced down Hamilton Street, circled the Soldiers & Sailors Monument, and returned.  The airship bearing the American flag won the race.  The following year, pilot Glenn Curtiss took off in his plane, using 19th Street as his runway, and flew over the Allentown Fair, in what was the first known heavier-than-air flight in the Lehigh Valley.

The first auto race was held at the fair in 1920. Sprint car races were sanctioned by the American Automobile Association (until 1955), the United States Automobile Club (1956–1966) and the International Motor Contest Association (1967 and 1968).  Sprint car legends Tommy Hinnershitz and Ira Vail both captured numerous wins on the half-mile dirt track, and  Indianapolis 500 winners Mario Andretti, A. J. Foyt and Parnelli Jones all raced at the Allentown Fair before going on to greater fame.  In 1960, Johnny Thomson was killed during a race at the fair when his car crashed through the inside track fence.  Although the last sanctioned auto race was held in 1968, demolition derbies continued to be popular event.

There was no fair held in 1917 and 1918 due to World War I. During this period, the fairground was transformed into Camp Crane, a training facility for the United States Army Ambulance Service (USAAS).  During this time, more than 20,000 soldiers lived in tents and barracks on the fairgrounds.  The caretaker's house, which stood at 1701 Chew Street until demolished in 1960 to make room for a bank, was used as the officer's club.

The fair wasn't held between 1942 and 1945 due to World War II. In 1951, Gen. Douglas MacArthur, his wife, and his son Arthur attended "Father and Son" day at the Allentown Fair, a visit described by local historian Frank Whelan as "probably among the most significant moments in the fair's history."

Beginning in the 1950s, musical concerts and performances held during Fair week starting drawing major acts and large crowds.  Roy Rogers and Lawrence Welk appeared during the 1960s, as did Johnny Carson and a touring version of Rowan & Martin's Laugh-In.  Andy Williams introduced the Osmond Brothers in 1964.  In 1964, Kate Smith made her first "community fair" performance at the Allentown Fair. Herb Alpert and the Tijuana Brass headlined in 1966, and the back cover of their album S.R.O. even featured a photograph taken during their performance.  On August 8, 1974, Liza Minnelli delayed her concert while Richard Nixon's resignation speech  was broadcast live over the public address system.  Her performance later that night broke box office records at the Allentown Fair.

21st century
In 2020, for the first time in 75 years, the festival was cancelled due to COVID-19 pandemic. It returned in 2021.

Attractions
The Great Allentown Fair offers many attractions, including:

Grandstand: A large outdoor stage featuring the fair's biggest musicians
Farmerama Theater: An amphitheater where talent contests are held and assorted daytime entertainment takes place
Music Tent: A tent where bands perform 
Main Entrance Plaza: An area where special shows, such as juggling acts, are held
Powers Great American Midways: The fair's carnival
Agriplex/Agriland: The fair's agricultural-themed areas

Grandstand performances
In 1911, a 7,070 seat grandstand was constructed at a cost of $100,000 to host horse racing and auto racing. 

In 1956, the grandstand was opened to major musician and band acts with Guy Lombardo the first booked grandstand act. Since then, Allentown Fairground's grandstand has featured many of the world's biggest musical acts, including:

Nelly, 2023
Tyler Hubbard, 2023
REO Speedwagon, 2023
Keith Urban, 2023
Dropkick Murphys, 2022
Cole Swindell, 2022
Carrie Underwood, 2021
Live, 2019
Bush, 2019
The Offspring, 2018
Kiss, 2016
Styx, 2015 and 2023
Tesla, 2015
Alice Cooper, 2014 and 2015
Weezer, 2010
Earth, Wind & Fire, 2009
Tim McGraw, 2009
Daughtry, 2008
Taylor Swift, 2007
Papa Roach, 2007
Buckcherry, 2007
Breaking Benjamin, 2005
Nickelback, 2005
Yes, 2004
Lynyrd Skynyrd, 2004
My Chemical Romance, 2002
Journey, 2002 and 2011
Toby Keith, 2001 and 2021
Kenny Chesney, 2001 and 2004
Goo Goo Dolls, 2000
Def Leppard, 1999, 2000, 2003, and 2015
98 Degrees, 1998
Backstreet Boys, 1998
Britney Spears, 1998
Poison, 1993
Alice in Chains, 1992
Ozzy Osbourne, 1992
Whitesnake, 1990
Metallica, 1989
Bob Dylan, 1989
Foreigner, 1985 and 2011
Mötley Crüe, 1985, 2005, 2014, and 2015
Rod Stewart, 1984
38 Special, 1984 
Rush, 1980 and 2010
Heart, 1980
ZZ Top, 1980, 2004 and 2008
Tom Petty and the Heartbreakers, 1980 and 1989
Cheap Trick, 1979
Foghat, 1978
Linda Ronstadt, 1977 
Hall & Oates, 1977 and 2019
Chicago, 1970, 1972, and 2009
Grand Funk Railroad, 1970
Jefferson Airplane, 1970

See also
 List of historic places in Allentown, Pennsylvania

References

Notes

External links

Official website

1852 establishments in Pennsylvania
Agricultural shows in the United States
Annual events in Pennsylvania
August events
Culture of Allentown, Pennsylvania
Fairs in the United States
Festivals in Pennsylvania
History of Allentown, Pennsylvania
Tourist attractions in Allentown, Pennsylvania
Recurring events established in 1852
September events